Li Xin (died 420), courtesy name Shiye, nickname Tongzhui, was a duke of the Chinese state Western Liang.  He succeeded his father Li Gao (Prince Wuzhao) in 417 and aggressively tried to pursue campaigns against rival Northern Liang's prince Juqu Mengxun, but fell into a trap set by Juqu Mengxun in 420 and was killed in battle, bringing destruction to his state (although his brother Li Xun tried to hold out but was defeated soon as well).

During Li Gao's reign 
It is not known when Li Xin was born, or whether his mother Lady Yin was his father Li Gao's wife or concubine.  He was Li Gao's second son, and so after Li Gao declared independence from Northern Liang and founded Western Liang in 400, it was not he, but his older brother Li Tan, who was created heir apparent.  The first historical reference to him was in 404, when Li Tan died, and Li Gao created him heir apparent to replace Li Tan.

In 410, Li Xin fought a battle with the Northern Liang prince Juqu Mengxun when Juqu Mengxun attacked Western Liang, but was defeated by Juqu Mengxun, and his general Zhu Yuanhu was captured, forcing Li Gao to use gold and silver to ransom Zhu.  In 411, he returned the favor, as after Juqu Mengxun made another attack on Western Liang but was forced to withdraw after his food supplies ran out, Li Xin attacked the Northern Liang army and dealt Juqu Mengxun a defeat, capturing Juqu Mengxun's general Juqu Bainian.

In 417, Li Gao grew ill, and after entrusting Li Xin to his own half-brother Song Yao -- telling him that Li Xin was now his son—died.  Li Xin succeeded him as duke, and Lady Yin was honored as princess dowager.

Reign 
Li Xin made his uncle Song Yao the prime minister, but meanwhile carried out cruel punishments and favored palace construction projects, both of which made the people feel burdened.  He also made plans to attack Northern Liang, further burdening his state.

Later in 417, Juqu Mengxun tried to trick Li Xin by having his governor of Zhangye Commandery (張掖, roughly modern Zhangye, Gansu), Juqu Guangzong pretend to surrender to Li Xin.  Li Xin, as requested by Juqu Guangzong, mobilized forces to try to relieve Juqu Guangzong at Zhangye, and Juqu Mengxun waited to ready to ambush Li Xin.  However, on the way to Zhangye, Li Xin realized that there was a trap, and he withdrew.  Juqu Mengxun tried to attack him, but he defeated Juqu Mengxun.

In 418, Juqu Mengxun attacked Western Liang again, and Li Xin was preparing to meet him in battle.  His official Zhang Tishun persuaded him against it, however, and instead he stayed in his capital Jiuquan (酒泉, in modern Jiuquan, Gansu), and Juqu Mengxun, not willing to siege the city, withdrew.  Later that year, because he had previously sent messengers to Jin, offering to be a vassal, Jin created him the Duke of Jiuquan.

In 419, with Li Xin's punishments and construction projects overburdening his people, his officials Zhang Xian and Fan Cheng advised him to be more lenient and more thrifty, pointing out that he would otherwise not be able to defeat Juqu Mengxun.  Li Xin ignored their advice.

In 420, Juqu Mengxun set another trap for Li Xin.  He pretended to attack Western Qin's city Haomen (浩亹, in modern Haidong Prefecture, Qinghai), but once reaching Haomen, immediately withdrew and hid his army at Chuanyan (川巖, near Zhangye).  Li Xin, believing wrongly that Juqu Mengxun's defenses were down, decided to attack Zhangye, against the advice of Song Yao and Zhang Tishun.  Princess Dowager Yin also spoke against it, pointing out that he had insufficient strength to conquer Northern Liang and warning him that a defeat would destroy his state.  He ignored them, but as they had predicted, as he approached Zhangye, Juqu Mengxun intercepted him and defeated him.  His generals then advised him to quickly withdraw to Jiuquan, but Li Xin, stating that he had disobeyed his mother and would only be able to see her again after a victory, engaged Juqu Mengxun again, suffering an even greater defeat, and he was killed in battle.  Juqu Mengxun quickly captured Jiuquan, and by 421 would take over the rest of Western Liang territory.

Personal information 
 Father
 Li Gao (Prince Wuzhao)
 Mother
 Lady Yin
 Children
 Li Zhong'er, the heir apparent, later official under Liu Song and Northern Wei, whose descendant Li Yuan would become the house of Tang emperors.

References

Western Liang (Sixteen Kingdoms) dukes
420 deaths
Jin dynasty (266–420) politicians
Generals from Gansu
Year of birth unknown
Politicians from Gansu